Mosaic gold or bronze powder refers to tin(IV) sulfide as used as a pigment in bronzing and gilding wood and metal work. It is obtained as a yellow scaly crystalline powder. The alchemists referred to it as aurum musivum, or aurum mosaicum. The term mosaic gold has also been used to refer to ormolu and to cut shapes of gold leaf, some darkened for contrast, arranged as a mosaic. The term bronze powder may also refer to powdered bronze alloy.

Mosaic gold appeared in Europe after the 14th century. Alchemists prepared it by combining mercury, tin, sal ammoniac, and sublimated sulfur (fleur de soufre), grinding, mixing, then setting them for three hours in a sand heat. The dirty sublimate being taken off, aurum mosaicum was found at the bottom of the matrass.

In the past it was used for medical purposes in most chronic and nervous ailments, and particularly convulsions of children; however, it is no longer recommended for any medical uses.

See also
 List of inorganic pigments

References 

Inorganic pigments
Visual arts materials
Alchemical substances
Tin(IV) compounds
Powders
Sulfides